Lars Mauritz Skytøen (13 December 1929 – 11 June 2016) was a Norwegian politician for the Labour Party. He was Minister of Industry and Craft 1979–1981.

References

1929 births
2016 deaths
Government ministers of Norway
Ministers of Trade and Shipping of Norway